Eagles Fly Early refers to:

 Eagles Fly Early (novel), 1959 Yugoslav children's novel by Branko Ćopić
 Eagles Fly Early (film), 1966 film based on the novel